The Malawi Congress of Trade Unions (MCTU) is a national trade union center in Malawi. It has a membership of 45,000 and is affiliated with the ICFTU African Regional Organisation.

References

1964 establishments in Malawi
Trade unions in Malawi
African Regional Organisation of the International Trade Union Confederation
Trade unions established in 1964